Sinar Photography AG is a Swiss company based in Zurich manufacturing specialized high-resolution view cameras for studio, reproduction, landscape and architecture photography.

Sinar's view-cameras allow both the lens and the film back or sensor back to move in rotation or linearly in any direction (up/down, left/right, front back linearly, and pitch yaw tilt rotations), thus allowing precise image alignment corrections. The cameras are thus often used in advertising, document reproduction, product and architectural photography, where correctly vertical image lines, fine focus accuracy, and extra details are wanted.

The name SINAR is explained by the company itself as "Still, Industrial, Nature, Architectural and Reproduction photography" in the English version of the April 2011 press release.  Other versions of the names were also used, with the S for studio, Sache, or science. In the Indonesian language,  translates into English as "light ray".

Founding
The business recalls its roots to Swiss photographer  who worked in Marseille from 1865 to 1878. In 1879 and 1892 Koch also established two family-owned photography studios in Schaffhausen. Koch worked as a portrait, landscape and alpine photographer and was considered one of the first Swiss champions of alpine photography. From 1894 until his death in 1897, Koch was also president of the Swiss Photographers Association. His son Hans-Carl, expanded the family-owned photography studios to include from 1911 photographic retailing. In 1947, the grandson of Koch senior—Carl Hans—a graduate photographer and photographic salesman, took over the family business on the early death of his father Hans-Carl, and founded the following year the Sinar company. Dissatisfied with the limited or imprecise nature of wooden view cameras (e.g. the large Kodak 3 and similar, and the popular Graphlex Graphic Graphlok series) and the limitations of technical (e.g. Linhof Technika) and field cameras of the day he developed a modular camera and received in 1947 a patent for his Sinar camera. His main aims were to produce a large format camera of high precision and simple operation, with a system of parts that were readily interchangeable. The Sinar system's versatility is based on the interchangeability of parts as well as a large number of accessories that have been produced over the years. Major components (rails, bellows, lensboards, and standards) made in the 1940s are still usable with currently manufactured Sinar equipment.

In 1968 Carl Hans' son entered the family business and the company's camera production moved to Feuerthalen (north of Zurich). Sinar moved its base of operations to Zurich after separating from Jenoptik in October 2009.

On 26 November 2013 Leica Camera AG took over Sinar Photography AG.

P-series
The Sinar P, introduced in 1970, had asymmetric tilts and swings, as opposed to the traditional center or base tilts. This permitted rapid and precise settings without losing sharpness on the axis.

The P series also introduced features such as self-arresting rack and pinion gearing and a precision-engineered quick format change system that allows the photographer to switch between 4x5/5x7/8x10 formats quickly without having to fully disassemble the rear standard. This was accomplished by using a common rear standard bearer and unlocking a single knob to switch among the various format frames. Another new feature implemented in the P series was the Sinar system of calculating swings and tilts as well as the Sinar depth of field calculator. A key feature of the Sinar P system, particularly in the domain of scientific and industrial photography, is the precise machine tolerances that are part of the fittings and movements.

F-series
The F series was the light-weight version ("F" for "Field"), offering less refined features than the P series.  The difference in weight is significant: the Sinar F 4x5 weighs about 3.3 kg and the Sinar P 4x5 weighs about 5.9 kg.

The original Sinar F is easily identified by a brushed aluminum monorail and other aluminum accents, while the Sinar F1, F2, and F3 models were made of the same materials, but painted black.  The Sinar F also has hard plastic knobs, versus the rubber-coated knobs of the F1 and F2.

The Sinar F and F1 models have a clip-on front standard (lens standard) that does not fully enclose the monorail.  The advantage is that this standard can easily be removed from the rail by loosening the clamp and lifting straight up, unlike the rear standard, and it is somewhat lighter weight.  The disadvantage of this design is that the rail clamping mechanism is susceptible to breakage if over-tightened.  The Sinar F2 and F3 models have a different front standard, which completely encloses the rail and also provides a geared focus adjustment, similar to the rear rail clamp on all Sinar F models.  The correct F2 standard can easily be identified as it is a mirror image of the rear standard.  The earlier F/F1 front standard has a low-profile metal hinge below the rail.

The F2 and F3 models also came standard with a light-metering back, while this was an option for the F and F1 models.  The F3 model is a digital/analog model that supports a variety of Sinar digital lenses and digital backs.

Accessories
Sinar has manufactured many accessories since its establishment:

A swing-out filter holder that allows the photographer to use a polarizing filter as well as 4x4 inch gel filters.

A 4x5 reflex attachment that employed an adjustable mirror for the best possible viewing of the image. 
Adapters (now discontinued) were made by Sinar to adapt this viewer to various other view camera makes such as Plaubel, Linhof, and Toyo.

The Zoom series of roll film backs, which allow the use of 120/220 film formats from 6x4.5 to 6x12 formats with excellent film flatness. The earlier versions of the Zoom film backs are usable on any 4x5 camera with an international (Graflok) back (later holders no longer have the Graflok grooves required).

The Sinar LCD shutter system enables their CCD camera backs to have a much extended density range in video mode for focusing capability in a wider range of ambient lighting. This system has been used in modified mode by RIT to obtain multispectral images suited to aging analysis of color pigments in artworks.

Integration of Canon and Nikon SLR cameras as camera backs onto the P standard with adapters from fellow Swiss camera accessories manufacturer, Foba.

Self-cocking shutters, lens-independent, automatic, with built-in apertures.

Film plane metering probes and meters.

Digital backs for the high-end studio environments.

Gallery

References

External links

 

1948 establishments in Switzerland
Cameras
Digital camera backs
Manufacturing companies based in Zürich
Photography companies of Switzerland
Swiss brands